Chromodoris is a genus of very colourful sea slugs or dorid nudibranchs, marine gastropod molluscs, and the type genus of the family Chromodorididae. Within the genus Chromodoris, there are currently 101 classified species. Species within Chromodoris are commonly found in tropical and subtropical waters, living as members of reef communities and preying primarily on sponges. A molecular phylogeny of the family Chromodorididae resulted in this genus being restricted to a smaller number of species than formerly, most of which have longitudinal black lines on the mantle. Many former members of Chromodoris were transferred to Goniobranchus

Anatomy
Chromodoris species exhibit one of the two major body types found within Nudibranchia. There are a few major bodily features that separate chromodorids from other sea slugs.

Mantle
Dorids have a thick mantle that exists over their foot, and in some species, the mantle can have tubercles (nodules along the surface of an organism that are made of keratin) of different concentrations, shapes, and sizes, providing some rigidity and protection for their soft, shell-less bodies. In most dorid species, the mantle holds toxins that defend the organism that are obtained through their diet.

Respiratory system
Chromodorids breathe oxygen principally through their gills, usually positioned in a featherlike structure located around the anus at their posterior, called the branchial plume.

Phylogeny and taxonomy
The classification of the family Chromodorididae has been the subject of many studies on nudibranches in recent years, most focusing on the phylogeny and its impact on the traditional taxonomies of the genera. Chromodoris was long considered to be the most diverse genus of the Chromodorididae; however, a study published in July 2018 on Indo-pacific species of chromodorid nudibranchs has shown that the genus should be categorized more strictly, and has been narrowed down to 22 species. These species characteristically have black stripes along their bodies and linear spawning.

Chemical defenses
Chromodorid nudibranchs commonly exhibit chemical defenses to protect themselves from predators. Most of the species that exhibit this behavior make use of bioactive compounds like alkaloids, diterpenes, and sesquiterpenes from the sponges they feed on. Nudibranchs can collect these compounds and store them as is, transform them, or be selectively sequestered, although there is no information on how common each mechanism is and which individual species exhibit the individual methods. Chromodorid nudibranchs in particular transport and store their toxic compounds in specialized storage glands located in strategic locations throughout the mantle, called mantle dermal formations (MDFs). These MDFs have been shown to harbor extremely high concentrations of distasteful and potent compounds in comparison to the rest of their body.

Reproduction
All nudibranchs are simultaneous hermaphrodites, with each individual possessing both male and female reproductive structures. During mating, two individuals compete for the position of male by darting their penises at one another until the victor penetrates the body wall of the other and impregnating them, forcing them to act as the female, an act commonly called "penis fencing." From here, the female lays eggs into a substrate, which hatch planktonic vestigial veliger larva, who will further evolve into adults.

Species
Species in the genus Chromodoris include:

 Chromodoris africana Eliot, 1904
 Chromodoris aila Er. Marcus, 1961
 Chromodoris albolimbata Bergh, 1907
 Chromodoris albonotata Bergh, 1875
 Chromodoris alternata Burn, 1957
 Chromodoris ambigua Rudman, 1987
 Chromodoris annae Bergh, 1877
 Chromodoris aspersa Gould, 1852
Chromodoris balat Bonomo & Gosliner, 2020
 Chromodoris barnardi (Collingwood, 1868)
Chromodoris baqe Bonomo & Gosliner, 2020
 Chromodoris boucheti Rudman, 1982
 Chromodoris briqua Marcus & Burch, 1965
 Chromodoris buchananae Gosliner & Behrens, 2000
 Chromodoris burni Rudman, 1982
 Chromodoris camoena Bergh, 1879
 Chromodoris cardinalis Bergh, 1880
 Chromodoris colemani Rudman, 1982
 Chromodoris dianae Gosliner & Behrens, 1998
 Chromodoris dictya Er. Marcus & Ev. Marcus, 1970
 Chromodoris elisabethina Bergh, 1877
 Chromodoris euelpis Bergh, 1907
 Chromodoris hamiltoni Rudman, 1977
 Chromodoris inconspicua Eliot, 1904
 Chromodoris inopinata Bergh, 1905
 Chromodoris joshi Gosliner & Behrens, 1998
Chromodoris kalawakan Bonomo & Gosliner, 2020
 Chromodoris kuiteri Rudman, 1982
 Chromodoris lapinigensis Bergh, 1879
 Chromodoris lata Risbec, 1928
 Chromodoris lentiginosa Pease, 1871
 Chromodoris lineolata Hasselt, 1824
 Chromodoris lochi Rudman, 1982
 Chromodoris magnifica Quoy & Gaimard, 1832 : Type species.
 Chromodoris mandapamensis Valdes, Mollo, & Ortea, 1999
 Chromodoris mariana Bergh, 1890
 Chromodoris marpessa Bergh, 1905
 Chromodoris michaeli Gosliner & Behrens, 1998
 Chromodoris nodulosa Bergh, 1905
 Chromodoris nona (Baba, 1953)
 Chromodoris ophthalmica Bergh, 1905
 Chromodoris orientalis Rudman, 1983
 Chromodoris pantharella Bergh, 1879
 Chromodoris papulosa Bergh, 1905
 Chromodoris paupera Bergh, 1877
 Chromodoris perola Ev. Marcus, 1976
 Chromodoris porcata Bergh, 1889
 Chromodoris pustulans Bergh, 1877
 Chromodoris quadricolor Rueppell & Leuckart, 1828
Chromodoris quagga Bonomo & Gosliner, 2020
 Chromodoris roseopicta Verrill, 1900
 Chromodoris rudolphi Bergh, 1880
 Chromodoris splendens Eliot, 1904
 Chromodoris striatella Bergh, 1877
 Chromodoris strigata Rudman, 1982
 Chromodoris tenuilinearis Farran, 1905
 Chromodoris tenuis Collingwood, 1881
 Chromodoris thompsoni Rudman, 1983
 Chromodoris trouilloti Risbec, 1928
 Chromodoris venusta Bergh, 1905
 Chromodoris virginea Bergh, 1877
 Chromodoris westraliensis O'Donoghue, 1924
 Chromodoris willani Rudman, 1982

Synonyms
 Chromodoris albonares Rudman, 1990: synonym of Goniobranchus albonares (Rudman, 1990)
 Chromodoris albopunctata Garrett, 1879: synonym of Goniobranchus albopunctatus Garrett, 1879
 Chromodoris albopustulosa Pease, 1860: synonym of Goniobranchus albopustulosus (Pease, 1860)
 Chromodoris alius Rudman, 1987: synonym of Goniobranchus alius (Rudman, 1987)
 Chromodoris agassizii: synonym of Felimare agassizii (Bergh, 1894)
 Chromodoris annulata Eliot, 1904: synonym of Goniobranchus annulatus (Eliot, 1904)
 Chromodoris antonii: synonym of Mexichromis antonii (Bertsch, 1976)
 Chromodoris aureomarginata Cheeseman, 1881: synonym of Goniobranchus aureomarginatus (Cheeseman, 1881)
 Chromodoris aureopurpurea Collingwood, 1881: synonym of Goniobranchus aureopurpureus (Collingwood, 1881)
 Chromodoris aurigera Rudman, 1990: synonym of Goniobranchus aurigerus (Rudman, 1990)
 Chromodoris australis: synonym of Thorunna australis (Risbec, 1928)
 Chromodoris banksi: synonym of Glossodoris dalli (Bergh, 1879)
 Chromodoris baumanni Bertsch, 1970: synonym of Glossodoris baumanni (Bertsch, 1970)
 Chromodoris bennetti: synonym of Hypselodoris bennetti (Angas, 1864)
 Chromodoris bimaensis Bergh, 1905: synonym Goniobranchus bimaensis Bergh, 1905
 Chromodoris binza Ev. Marcus & Er. Marcus, 1963: synonym of Felimida binza (Ev. Marcus & Er. Marcus, 1963)
 Chromodoris bistellata: synonym of Aphelodoris antillensis
 Chromodoris britoi Ortea & Pérez, 1983: synonym of Felimida britoi (Ortea & Perez, 1983)
 Chromodoris bullocki: synonym of Hypselodoris bullocki
 Chromodoris californiensis: synonym of Hypselodoris californiensis
 Chromodoris cantrainii Bergh, 1879: synonym of Felimare picta (Schultz in Philippi, 1836)
 Chromodoris carnea: synonym of Hypselodoris carnea
 Chromodoris cazae Gosliner & Behrens, 2004: synonym of Goniobranchus cazae (Gosliner & Behrens, 2004)
 Chromodoris charlottae Schrödl, 1999: synonym of Goniobranchus charlottae (Schrödl, 1999)
 Chromodoris clenchi Russell, 1935 - the harlequin blue doris: synonym of Felimida clenchi (Russell, 1935)
 Chromodoris clitonota Bergh, 1905: synonym of Durvilledoris lemniscata (Quoy & Gaimard, 1832)
 Chromodoris coi Risbec, 1956: synonym of Goniobranchus coi (Risbec, 1956)
 Chromodoris collingwoodi Rudman, 1987: synonym of  Goniobranchus collingwoodi (Rudman, 1987)
 Chromodoris conchyliata Yonow, 1984: synonym of Goniobranchus conchyliatus (Yonow, 1984)
 Chromodoris dalli: synonym of Glossodoris dalli (Bergh, 1879)
 Chromodoris daphne Angas, 1864: synonym of Goniobranchus daphne (Angas, 1864)
 Chromodoris decora Pease, 1860: synonym of Goniobranchus decorus (Pease, 1860)
 Chromodoris dollfusi: synonym of Hypselodoris dollfusi
 Chromodoris elegans (Cantraine, 1835): synonym of Felimare picta (Schultz in Philippi, 1836)
 Chromodoris elegantula Philippi, 1844: synonym of Felimida elegantula (Philippi, 1844)
 Chromodoris epicuria Basedow & Hedley, 1905: synonym of Goniobranchus epicurius (Basedow & Hedley, 1905)
 Chromodoris fentoni Valdés, Gatdula, Sheridan & Herrera, 2011: synonym of Felimida fentoni
 Chromodoris festiva: synonym of Mexichromis festiva (Angas, 1864)
 Chromodoris fidelis Kelaart, 1858: synonym of Goniobranchus fidelis (Kelaart, 1858)
 Chromodoris flava: synonym of Diversidoris flava (Eliot, 1904)
 Chromodoris francoisae: synonym of Mexichromis francoisae (Bouchet, 1980)
 Chromodoris galactos Rudman & Johnson in Rudman, 1985: synonym of Goniobranchus galactos (Rudman & S. Johnson, 1985)
 Chromodoris galexorum Bertsch, 1978: synonym of Felimida galexorum (Bertsch, 1978)
 Chromodoris geminus Rudman, 1987: synonym of Goniobranchus geminus (Rudman, 1987)
 Chromodoris geometrica Risbec, 1928: synonym of Goniobranchus geometricus (Risbec, 1928)
 Chromodoris ghanensis: synonym of Glossodoris ghanensis
 Chromodoris ghardagana [sic]: synonym of Hypselodoris ghardaqana (Gohar & Aboul-Ela, 1957)
 Chromodoris gleniei Kelaart, 1858: synonym of Goniobranchus gleniei (Kelaart, 1858)
 Chromodoris godeffroyana: synonym of Risbecia godeffroyana
 Chromodoris goslineri Ortea & Valdés in Ortea, Valdés & Garcia Gómez, 1996: synonym of Felimida goslineri (Ortea & Valdés, 1996)
 Chromodoris grahami Thompson, 1980: synonym of Felimida grahami
 Chromodoris haliclona: synonym of Noumea haliclona
 Chromodoris heatherae Gosliner, 1994 - Red-spotted nudibranch: synonym of Goniobranchus heatherae (Gosliner, 1994)
 Chromodoris hintuanensis Gosliner & Behrens, 1998: synonym of Goniobranchus hintuanensis (Gosliner & Behrens, 1998)
 Chromodoris hunterae Rudman, 1983: synonym of Goniobranchus hunterae (Rudman, 1983)
 Chromodoris imperialis: synonym of Risbecia imperialis (Pease, 1860)
 Chromodoris kempfi: synonym of Mexichromis kempfi
 Chromodoris kitae Gosliner, 1994: synonym of Goniobranchus kitae (Gosliner, 1994)
 Chromodoris kpone Edmunds, 1981: synonym of Felimida kpone (Edmunds, 1981)
 Chromodoris krohni Vérany, 1846: synonym of Felimida krohni (Vérany, 1846)
 Chromodoris kuniei Pruvot-Fol, 1930: synonym of Goniobranchus kuniei (Pruvot-Fol, 1930)
 Chromodoris lekker Gosliner, 1994: synonym of Goniobranchus lekker (Gosliner, 1994)
 Chromodoris lemniscata: synonym of Durvilledoris lemniscata
 Chromodoris leopardus: synonym of Goniobranchus leopardus Rudman, 1987
 Chromodoris lilacina (Gould, 1852): synonym of Tayuva lilacina (Gould, 1852)
 Chromodoris lineata nigrolineata: synonym of Hypselodoris nigrolineata
 Chromodoris loringi Angas, 1864: synonym of Goniobranchus loringi (Angas, 1864)
 Chromodoris luteopunctata Gantes, 1962: synonym of Felimida luteopunctata (Gantès, 1962)
 Chromodoris luteorosea Rapp, 1827: synonym of Felimida luteorosea (Rapp, 1827)
 Chromodoris macfarlandi Cockerell, 1901 - Three-stripe doris: synonym of Felimida macfarlandi (Cockerell, 1901)
 Chromodoris maculosa: synonym of Hypselodoris maculosa
 Chromodoris marenzelleri Bergh, 1888: synonym of Hypselodoris festiva (A. Adams, 1861)
 Chromodoris mariei: synonym of Mexichromis mariei
 Chromodoris marislae Bertsch in Bertsch, Ferreira, Farmer, & Hayes, 1973: synonym of Felimida marislae (Bertsch, 1973)
 Chromodoris maritimais a: synonym of Hypselodoris maritima
 Chromodoris multimaculosa Rudman, 1987: synonym of Goniobranchus multimaculosus (Rudman, 1987)
 Chromodoris naiki Valdes, Mollo, & Ortea, 1999: synonym of Goniobranchus naiki (Valdés, Mollo & Ortea, 1999)
 Chromodoris neona Marcus, 1955: synonym of Felimida neona (Er. Marcus, 1955)
 Chromodoris nigrostriata a: synonym of Hypselodoris nigrostriata
 Chromodoris norrisi Farmer, 1963: synonym of Felimida norrisi (Farmer, 1963)
 Chromodoris nyalya: synonym of Hypselodoris nyalya (Ev. Marcus & Er. Marcus, 1967)
 Chromodoris obsoleta Rüppell & Leuckart, 1831: synonym of Goniobranchus obsoletus (Rüppell & Leuckart, 1831)
 Chromodoris orsinii: synonym of Felimare orsinii
 Chromodoris paulomarcioi Dominguez, Garcia & Troncoso, 2006: synonym of Felimida paulomarcioi Dominguez, Garcia & Troncoso, 2006
 Chromodoris peasei: synonym of Hypselodoris peasei
 Chromodoris perplexa: synonym of Digidentis perplexa
 Chromodoris petechialis Gould, 1852: synonym of Goniobranchus petechialis (Gould, 1852)
 Chromodoris placida: synonym of Hypselodoris placida
 Chromodoris porterae: synonym of Mexichromis porterae
 Chromodoris ponga Er. Marcus & Ev. Marcus, 1970: synonym of Felimida ponga (Er. Marcus & Ev. Marcus, 1970)
 Chromodoris preciosa Kelaart, 1858: synonym of Goniobranchus preciosus (Kelaart, 1858)
 Chromodoris purpurea Risso in Guerin, 1831: synonym of Felimida purpurea (Risso in Guérin, 1831)
 Chromodoris pusilla: synonym of Durvilledoris pusilla
 Chromodoris regalis Ortea, Caballer & Moro, 2001: synonym of Felimida regalis (Ortea, Caballer & Moro, 2001)
 Chromodoris reticulata  (Quoy & Gaimard, 1832) : synonym of Goniobranchus reticulatus (Quoy & Gaimard, 1832)
 Chromodoris roboi Gosliner & Behrens, 1998: synonym of Goniobranchus roboi (Gosliner & Behrens, 1998)
 Chromodoris rodomaculata Ortea & Valdés, 1991: synonym of Felimida rodomaculata (Ortea & Valdés, 1992)
 Chromodoris rolani Ortea, 1988: synonym of Felimida rolani (Ortea, 1988)
 Chromodoris rosans Bergh, 1889: synonym of Hypselodoris rosans (Bergh, 1889)
 Chromodoris rubrocornuta Rudman, 1985: synonym of Goniobranchus rubrocornutus (Rudman, 1985)
 Chromodoris rufomaculata Pease, 1871: synonym of Goniobranchus rufomaculatus (Pease, 1871)
 Chromodoris rufomarginata (Bergh, 1890): synonym of Glossodoris rufomarginata (Bergh, 1890)
 Chromodoris runcinata Bergh, 1877: synonym of Hypselodoris infucata (Rüppell & Leuckart, 1831)
 Chromodoris ruzafai Ortea, Bacallado, & Valdes, 1992: synonym of Felimida ruzafai (Ortea, Bacallado & Valdés, 1992)
 Chromodoris saintvincentius: synonym of Hypselodoris saintvincentius
 Chromodoris sedna: synonym of Glossodoris sedna
 Chromodoris semperi nigrostriata: synonym of Hypselodoris nigrostriata
 Chromodoris sibogae: synonym of Glossodoris sibogae
 Chromodoris sinensis Rudman, 1985: synonym of Goniobranchus sinensis (Rudman, 1985)
 Chromodoris socorroensis Behrens, Gosliner & Hermosillo, 2009: synonym of Felimida socorroensis (Behrens, Gosliner & Hermosillo, 2009)
 Chromodoris sonora: synonym of Glossodoris dalli
 Chromodoris sphoni Marcus, 1971: synonym of Felimida sphoni Ev. Marcus, 1971
 Chromodoris splendida: synonym of Goniobranchus splendidus Angas, 1864
 Chromodoris tasmaniensis Bergh, 1905: synonym of Goniobranchus tasmaniensis (Bergh, 1905)
 Chromodoris tennentana Kelaart, 1859 -: synonyms: Chromodoris cavae Eliot, 1904; Chromodoris vicina: synonym of Goniobranchus tennentanus (Kelaart, 1859)
 Chromodoris tinctoria Rüppell & Leuckart, 1831 -: synonyms: Chromodoris alderi, Chromodoris reticulata: synonym of Goniobranchus tinctorius (Rüppell & Leuckart, 1828)
 Chromodoris tricolor: synonym of Hypselodoris tricolor
 Chromodoris trimarginata Winckworth, 1946: synonym of  Goniobranchus trimarginatus (Winckworth, 1946)
 Chromodoris tritos Yonow, 1994: synonym of Goniobranchus tritos (Yonow, 1994)
 Chromodoris tryoni: synonym of Risbecia tryoni
 Chromodoris tumulifera Collingwood, 1881: synonym of Goniobranchus tumuliferus (Collingwood, 1881)
 Chromodoris tura: synonym of Mexichromis tura
 Chromodoris varians: synonym of Noumea varians
 Chromodoris verrieri Crosse, 1875: synonym of Goniobranchus verrieri (Crosse, 1875)
 Chromodoris vibrata Pease, 1860: synonym of Goniobranchus vibratus (Pease, 1860)
 Chromodoris villafranca: synonym of Felimare villafranca
 Chromodoris westralensis [sic]: synonym of Chromodoris westraliensis (O'Donoghue, 1924)
 Chromodoris woodwardi Rudman, 1983: synonym of Goniobranchus woodwardae (Rudman, 1983)
 Chromodoris youngbleuthi: synonym of Glossodoris rufomarginata
 Chromodoris zebra: synonym of Felimare zebra
 Chromodoris zebrina: synonym of Hypselodoris zebrina

References
 

 Rudman W.B. (1977) Chromodorid opisthobranch Mollusca from East Africa and the tropical West Pacific. Zoological Journal of the Linnean Society 61: 351-397
 Rudman W.B. (1984) The Chromodorididae (Opisthobranchia: Mollusca) of the Indo-West Pacific: a review of the genera. Zoological Journal of the Linnean Society 81 (2/3): 115-273 page(s): 130
 Vaught, K.C. (1989). A classification of the living Mollusca. American Malacologists: Melbourne, FL (USA). . XII, 195 pp.
 Rudman W.B. & Darvell B.W. (1990) Opisthobranch molluscs of Hong Kong: Part 1. Goniodorididae, Onchidorididae, Triophidae, Gymnodorididae, Chromodorididae (Nudibranchia). Asian Marine Biology 7: 31-79 page(s): 55
 Gofas, S.; Le Renard, J.; Bouchet, P. (2001). Mollusca, in: Costello, M.J. et al. (Ed.) (2001). European register of marine species: a check-list of the marine species in Europe and a bibliography of guides to their identification. Collection Patrimoines Naturels, 50: pp. 180–213
 Johnson R.F. & Gosliner T.M. (2012) Traditional taxonomic groupings mask evolutionary history: A molecular phylogeny and new classification of the chromodorid nudibranchs. PLoS ONE 7(4): e33479

Chromodorididae
Gastropod genera